Two destroyers of the Spanish Navy were named Gravina –

Spanish Navy ship names